William Edward "Billy, Pud" Hamilton (February 10, 1874 – October 23, 1965) was a Canadian professional ice hockey defenceman who was active in the early 1900s. Hamilton played for the Pittsburgh Athletic Club in the Western Pennsylvania Hockey League, as well as for the Michigan Soo Indians in the International Professional Hockey League. He also appeared in two games with the Pittsburgh Bankers.

Pud Hamilton played with a rough edge to his game and a Pittsburgh Press report from January 1904 says he was released by manager Charles Miller of the Pittsburgh Athletic Club on account of his temper.

He was born in Kingston, Ontario.

Statistics
Exh. = Exhibition games

Statistics per Society for International Hockey Research at sihrhockey.org

References

External links
The Origins and Development of the International Hockey League and its effect on the Sport of Professional Ice Hockey in North America Daniel Scott Mason, University of British Columbia, 1992

1874 births
1965 deaths
Canadian ice hockey defencemen
Cobalt Silver Kings players
Ice hockey people from Ontario
Michigan Soo Indians players
Pittsburgh Athletic Club (ice hockey) players
Pittsburgh Bankers players
Sportspeople from Kingston, Ontario